Beckenbauer is a German surname. Notable people with the surname include:

Franz Beckenbauer (born 1945), German former footballer
Stephan Beckenbauer (1968–2015), German footballer, son of Franz Beckenbauer

See also
Franz-Beckenbauer-Cup, an annual friendly association football match
Beckenbauer Seur-In, Thai footballer

German-language surnames